Eric Burton Frederic (born July 23, 1982), known professionally as Ricky Reed, is an American artist, music producer, singer, songwriter, and founder of Nice Life Recording Company. From 2005 to 2014, Reed was also known as Wallpaper.

Early work 
He was the lead singer of the Bay Area band Locale A.M. from 2001–2004.

Awards and nominations
Reed has received RIAA platinum records for two Jason Derulo singles: "Talk Dirty" ft. 2 Chainz (4× Platinum) and "Wiggle" ft. Snoop Dogg (2× Platinum).

In 2015, Reed received a BMI Pop Award for his work on "Talk Dirty".

Discography

Albums
 Ricky Reed Is Real (as Wallpaper, 2013)
 The Room (2020)

Singles
 "Express Myself" (2016) 
 "Be The 1" (2017) 
 "Joan of Arc" (2017) 
 "Good Vibrations" (2017)

Songwriting and production credits

References

Living people
1982 births
Record producers from California
Musicians from Oakland, California
Singers from California
Songwriters from California
Grammy Award winners